Wedgewood Park is a neighbourhood in St. John's, Newfoundland and Labrador, located north of the city centre.

A former town, Wedgewood Park was amalgamated into the city along with other areas, most notably the town Goulds, in 1991.

Wedgewood Park lies in the Torbay Road, Highland Drive, Carrick Drive, and Newfoundland Drive area.

See also
Neighbourhoods in St. John's, Newfoundland and Labrador

Neighbourhoods in St. John's, Newfoundland and Labrador